Back to Mom's (original title: Retour chez ma mère) is a 2016 French comedy film directed by Éric Lavaine.

Plot 
This is the story of a woman of forty, Stephanie, who loses her job in an architectural firm and is forced to move back in with her mother. For her, it's double pain : she must live with her mother every day and face the jealousy of her brothers and sisters.

Cast 

 Josiane Balasko as Jacqueline Mazerin
 Alexandra Lamy as Stéphanie Mazerin
 Mathilde Seigner as Carole Mazerin
 Philippe Lefebvre as Nicolas Mazerin
 Jérôme Commandeur as Alain Bordier
 Didier Flamand as Jean
 Cécile Rebboah as Charlotte
 Guilaine Londez as Catherine
 Alexandra Campanacci as Sylvie 
 Nathan Dellemme as Roger
 Patrick Bosso as Michel, job center agent

Production
The film was shot in Paris and Aix-en-Provence. It started in June 2015 and ended 20 August 2015.

References

External links
 

2016 films
2016 comedy films
French comedy films
Films about families
Films directed by Éric Lavaine
2010s French films